Major General Henry DeWitt Hamilton (February 26, 1863 - August 18, 1942) was the Adjutant General of the New York State Militia starting in 1912.

Biography
He was born on February 26, 1863, in White Hall, Illinois, to Edwin Benjamin Brown Hamilton (1821-1894) and Mary Ann Hildred Chandler. He attended Shurtleff College and Columbia University and was admitted to the bar in New York in 1884. On June 30, 1893, in Newark, New Jersey, he married Ada Estelle Brown.

He was the Adjutant General of the New York State Militia starting in 1912. In 1923 he was appointed as the secretary of the Rhode Island Democratic Committee.

He died on August 18, 1942, in Barrington, Rhode Island. He was buried in Arlington National Cemetery.

References

External links

1863 births
1942 deaths
Adjutants General of New York (state)
People from White Hall, Illinois
People from Barrington, Rhode Island
Burials at Arlington National Cemetery
New York (state) lawyers
Shurtleff College alumni
Columbia University alumni